Multani may refer to:

 something of, from, or related to Multan, a city in Punjab, Pakistan
 Multani dialect, the standard dialect of the Saraiki language of Pakistan
 Multani alphabet, a historic script
 Multani (Unicode block), containing Multani alphabet characters
 Multani people, or Saraikis, an ethnic group of Pakistan
 Multani Khussa, type of footwear from Multan
 Multani Caravanserai, caravanserai in Baku, Azerbaijan
 15th Lancers (Cureton's Multanis), cavalry regiment of the British Indian Army
 Multani (caste), a Muslim community found in the Gujarat state in India
 Multani Lohar, Muslim community of Gujarat, India
 Multani (raga), a raga in Indian classical music
 Multani v. Commission scolaire Marguerite‑Bourgeoys, a 2006 decision of the Supreme Court of Canada
 Multani Mal Modi College, in Patiala, India
 Ali Haider Multani (1690–1785), Punjabi Sufi poet
 Ayn al-Mulk Multani, commander of the Delhi Sultanate in India
 Har Karan Ibn Mathuradas Kamboh Multani, writer during the Mughal Empire

See also 
 Mitanni, a state of the ancient Near East

Language and nationality disambiguation pages